Cartaxo is a municipality in the district of Santarém in continental Portugal. The population in 2011 was 24,462, in an area of 158.17 km2. The urbanized centre of Cartaxo had a population of 9,507 in 2001.

History

In written and oral history, the territory of Cartaxo was an important point in the interior of the country. A Roman road, crossing Alenquer (Lerabriga), connected ancient Olissipo (Lisbon) to Santarém (Scallabis) through the territory of Cartaxo. Yet, before the Romans, other civilizations settled in the region, establishing castros in Vila Nova de São Pedro, Vale do Tejo or in the areas of Muge.
 
Situated in the plains of the Ribatejo, Cartaxo was a battleground between Muslim and the Christians. Due to its proximity to Santarém, it was one of the centres disputed between Muslim and Christian forces for years, resulting in the destruction of Cartaxo. King Sancho II of Portugal found it necessary to repopulate the area, since it was located in a privileged position with fertile lands. He, therefore, assigned the land of Cartaxinho (today Ribeira do Cartaxo) to Pedro Pacheco, who was responsible for constructing a shelter for the poor, a task that neither Pedro Pacheco nor his descendants would accomplish.

Oral tradition suggests that the name Cartaxo was given to the lands by Queen Elizabeth of Portugal who, on a journey to the Monastery of Almoster, stopped to rest and quench her thirst. Alongside a spring, she was surprised by the beautiful song of an unfamiliar bird. Asking one of the peasants about the songbird, the serf responded that the song came from a bird of the kind called cartaxos or cartaxinhos. Enchanted by the place, the Queen ordered that the land, then called Lugar da Fonte, receive the name Lugar do Cartaxo. It is unclear whether there is any truth to this story.

In 1312, Cartaxo received its first foral (charter), signed in Leiria by King Dinis of Portugal, confirmed in 1487 by King John II (in Santarém), and in 1496 by Manuel (also in Santarém). The first foral, issued by Dinis on 21 March 1312, was sent to his vassal, Garcia Martins, originating the foundation of the locality of Cartaxo. In this act, Dinis exempted the region from taxes for those who grew and cultivated grapes during the first five years of their tenure. Settlers who accepted these land rights were required in return to present each year an eighth of their produce in wine and linen.
 
The historical importance of the municipality is supported by events of the Battle of Ourique, which were probably linked to Vila Chã de Ourique (1139), a concession of foral to Pontével, by King Sancho (1194) and the existence of the Royal Palaces of Valada (1361-1365).
 
In the middle of the 19th century, Cartaxo was one of the more populated areas of Estremadura, in the Comarca of Santarém, with just over 200 inhabitants. On the death of King John IV of Portugal, his testament granted several "honours" to his daughter (in 1656). On 10 December 1815, by royal decree from Rio de Janeiro, King John VI granted it administrative independence, followed up on 21 June 1995 with its elevation to the status of city.

At the end of the 19th century, owing to the growth of technological innovations, Cartaxo became the centre of production of the typical wine of the Valley of the Tejo, much of which was sent by ship to Lisbon.

Geography

Physical geography
Direct access by the A1 motorway, its variant the Estrada Nacional E.N. 365–2, to the intersection of the A1 at Aveiras de Cima, also the E.N.3, that crosses the municipality, connecting the area between Carregado and Santarém.

The fields, town and flat-lands, with the river at their feet, make Cartaxo a rich landscape. The municipality is marked by agricultural fields, primarily vineyards, that occupy a large portion of the land. Vine cultivation and wine production has always been linked to the municipality, earning it the title Wine Capital of the Ribatejo.

Human geography
 
Administratively, the municipality is divided into 6 civil parishes (freguesias):
 Cartaxo e Vale da Pinta
 Ereira e Lapa
 Pontével
 Valada
 Vale da Pedra
 Vila Chã de Ourique

The municipality is served by the Linha Ferroviária do Norte, with the station at Setil, the most important: it is part of the national rail network connection between the north and south. The rail stations in Santana and Reguengo are also points of departure and ingress to Cartaxo, permitting a level of regional mobility.

Twin towns — Sister cities

Cartaxo is twinned with:
 Słupsk, Poland.

Architecture

Civic
 Assembly House of Cartaxo
 Bandstand of Cartaxo
 Bandstand of Pontével
 Cartaxo Market
 Casa do Povo de Pontével
 Commemorative Pillory of Pontével
 Fountain of Concha
 Hospital of the Misericórdia of Cartaxo
 Lime Kiln of São Gens
 Medieval Bridge of Pontével
 Municipal Culture Centre of Cartaxo
 Palace of Chavões, sold at the end of the 14th century, the estate of Chavões was left in the will of Lourenço Gonçalves to the Church of Santo Estevão, in Santarém; since the middle of the 15th century it passed hands between various proprietors. By the beginning of the 17th century, it was purchased by Rui Telles de Menezes, Count of Unhão who constructed the "U-Shaped", classic Mannerist Palace, similar to the Palácio da Quinta das Torres, in Setúbal;
 Pontével Market
 Residence of the Countess of Pontével
 Residence of the Camelo Family
 Residence of Dr. Egas de Azevedo
 Seniors Home of São João
 Well of São Bartolomeu

Religious
 Chapel of Nossa Senhora do Desterro
 Chapel of Santo Cristo
 Chapel of Senhor dos Passos
 Church of Nossa Senhora da Expectação
 Church of Nossa Senhora da Purificação
 Church of São Bartolomeu
 Church of São João Baptista
 Church of the Espírito Santo  
 Cross of Cartaxo

Notable citizens
 Cosme Delgado (c.1530 in Cartaxo – 1596) a Portuguese Renaissance composer. 
 Marco Chagas (born 1956 in Pontével) a retired professional cyclist, four-time winner of the Volta a Portugal
 Qwentin (formed in 2003 in Cartaxo ) an alternative rock band

See also
Cartaxo IPR

References

Cities in Portugal
Populated places in Santarém District
Municipalities of Santarém District
People from Cartaxo